Parlatoriina is a subtribe of armored scale insects.

Genera
Archangelskaia
Madaparlaspis
Parlatoria
Syngenaspis

References

Parlatoriini